Gar Anthony Haywood is an American author of crime fiction. He was born in Los Angeles in 1954, and worked as a computer technician for over a decade before he started publishing novels.

Fear of The Dark (1988) won the Shamus Award for best first private investigator novel. It also spawned a long-running series that featured the protagonist Aaron Gunner. The Aaron Gunner books are hardboiled detective fiction, inspired by Ross Macdonald's Los Angeles novels. Haywood has also written several standalone thrillers, as well as a pair of light, comic mysteries.

Haywood has also written numerous screenplays for television, including an episode of New York Undercover and the TV movie adaptation of Bad As I Wanna Be, the autobiography of basketball player Dennis Rodman.

Aaron Gunner mystery novels
Good Man Gone Bad (Prospect Park, 2019) is Heywood's seventh mystery novel, featuring Aaron Gunner, 60-year-old African-American private investigator.

References

1954 births
American crime fiction writers
Living people
American male novelists
Writers from Los Angeles
American male screenwriters
American male television writers
20th-century American novelists
21st-century American novelists
20th-century American male writers
21st-century American male writers
Screenwriters from California
Anthony Award winners